

The Farman F.211 was a French four-seat day or night bomber designed and built by the Farman Aviation Works for the French Air Force.

Development
Designed as a day/night bomber the F.211 was similar but smaller than the F.220. The F.211 was a high-wing braced monoplane with engines mounted on stub-wings with each stub wing having a pair of Gnome-Rhône Titan 7Kcrs radial engines, one tractor and one pusher. The type did not enter production.

Variants
F.211
Four-seat day or night bomber with four 300hp (224kW) Gnome-Rhône Titan 7Kcrs radial engines.
F.212
Improved design with more powerful 350hp (261kW) Gnome-Rhône 7Kds radial engines, an increased bomb load of 1400kg (3086lb) and other detail changes.
F.215
Proposed airliner version with two crew and 12 passengers, not built.

Specifications (F.211)

References

Notes

Bibliography
 

1930s French bomber aircraft
F.211
Four-engined push-pull aircraft
High-wing aircraft
Aircraft first flown in 1932